Félix Auger-Aliassime was the defending champion, but chose not to participate.

Wu Yibing won the title, defeating Axel Geller in the final, 6–4, 6–4.

Seeds

Main draw

Finals

Top half

Section 1

Section 2

Bottom half

Section 3

Section 4

Qualifying

Seeds

Qualifiers

Draw

First qualifier

Second qualifier

Third qualifier

Fourth qualifier

Fifth qualifier

Sixth qualifier

Seventh qualifier

Eighth qualifier

External links 
 Draw

Boys' Singles
US Open, 2017 Boys' Singles